MHC class I polypeptide–related sequence A (MICA) is a highly polymorphic cell surface glycoprotein encoded by the MICA gene located within MHC locus. MICA is related to MHC class I and it has similar domain structure, however, it is not associated with β2-microglobulin nor binds peptides as conventional MHC class I molecules do. MICA rather functions as a stress-induced ligand (as a danger signal) for integral membrane protein receptor NKG2D ("natural-killer group 2, member D"). MICA is broadly recognized by NK cells, γδ T cells, and CD8+ αβ T cells which carry NKG2D receptor on their cell surface and which are activated via this interaction.

Structure 
The MICA gene is highly polymorphic in humans with more than 50 defined alleles. It is located on chromosome 6 and the protein is expressed in two isoforms formed by alternative splicing: MICA1 and MICA2 which is lacking exon 3. MICA contains external α1α2α3 domain, transmembrane segment and C-terminal cytoplasmic tail. It binds in a form of monomer to a KLRK1/NKG2D homodimer.

There are no orthologs of the MICA in mice species.

Expression 
Expression of MICA can be upregulated by heat shock or by exposure of the cells to DNA damaging conditions (for example ionizing radiation, chromatin-modifying interventions and inhibitors of DNA replication). The expression can be as well affected by some infectious agents such as human cytomegalovirus (HCMV), human adenovirus 5, M. tuberculosis, diarrheagenic E.coli, or human papillomavirus (HPV). 

microRNA-183 downregulates MICA expression after exposure to transforming growth factor beta (TGFβ).

In normal tissue, MICA is expressed mainly intracellularly with just a small fraction appearing on the surface of some epithelial cells. There is no expression of MICA in the cells of the central nervous system (CNS).

Function 
MICA plays the role of stress-induced self-antigen and serves as a ligand for the KLRK1/NKG2D killer activation receptor. Engagement of NKG2D-MICA results in activation of effector cytolytic responses of T cells and NK cells against epithelial tumor cells (or other stressed cells) expressing MICA on their surface. 

As a defense mechanism, tumor cells are able to avoid recognition of MICA by the immune system through proteolytic shedding of the surface expressed protein by the cooperation of disulfide isomerase (ERp5) and ADAM (a disintegrin and metalloproteinase) and MMP (matrix metalloproteinase) proteases targeting membrane-proximal α3 domain. High levels of MICA in the serum of tumor patients are positively related to tumor size and poor prognosis.

Variations in the MICA gene are also associated with susceptibility to psoriasis 1 and psoriatic arthritis and MICA-specific antibodies or its shedding are involved in the monoclonal gammopathy of undetermined significance´s (MGUS) progression to multiple myeloma.

See also 
 MHC class I
 Major histocompatibility complex
MHC class I polypeptide-related sequence B

References

Further reading